The Dutch Cross Country Championships is an annual cross country running organised by the Royal Dutch Athletics Federation that serves as the national championship for the sport in the Netherlands. It is usually held in February or March.

It was first held in 1919 for men only. A women's championship race was introduced in 1963. A men's short race was added to the programme in 1937 and a women's version was added in 1999. The latter races served as with national selection for that section at the IAAF World Cross Country Championships from 1998 to 2006.

Guest athletes from other nations occasionally compete at the competition, but are not eligible for the national title. Several guests have gone on to place first in the race. In the men's long race Ethiopian's Getaneh Tessema and Tadesse Woldemeskle took the 1995 and 1996 titles, respectively. Ukraine's Vitaliy Shafar won in 2011 and Ethiopia's Faisa Dame Tasama in 2007 and 2013. In the women's long race, Ethiopian Zewdnesh Ayele Belachu won the 2015 title and Ana Dulce Félix of Portugal won in 2012.

Editions

Men

Note: The short course race was held separately in several years: 1950 on 2 April in Amersfoort, 1951 on 15 April in Groningen, 1952 on 14 April in Arnhem, 1953 on 6 April in Wassenaar, 1954 on 28 March in IJmuiden, 1955 on 3 April in Helmond, 1956 on 8 April in Groningen, 1957 on 7 April in Vught, 1958 on 2 November in Oisterwijk, 1959 on 8 November in Dordrecht, 1960 on 16 October in Tuindorp Oostzaan, 1961 on 1 October in Gouda.

Women

References

List of winners
National Crosscountry Champions for The Netherlands. Association of Road Racing Statisticians (2017-03-06). Retrieved 2020-07-03.
Dutch Championships. GBR Athletics. Retrieved 2020-07-03.

External links
Royal Dutch Athletics Federation website

National cross country running competitions
Athletics competitions in the Netherlands
Annual sporting events in the Netherlands
Recurring sporting events established in 1919
1919 establishments in the Netherlands
Cross country running in the Netherlands